Gate of Heaven Cemetery may refer to:

Gate of Heaven Cemetery (Silver Spring, Maryland)
Gate of Heaven Cemetery (East Hanover, New Jersey)
Gate of Heaven Cemetery (Hawthorne, New York)